Taza Sport Club, is an Iraqi football team based in Taza Khurmatu, Kirkuk, that plays in Iraq Division Three.

Stadium
In February 2014, the Ministry of Youth and Sports opened the Taza stadium, with a capacity of 1,000 spectators, and an opening match was held between Taza and Tuz.

Managerial history
 Mohammed Akbar
 Adel Shakour
 Mohammed Qurrah

See also 
 2019–20 Iraq FA Cup
 2020–21 Iraq FA Cup

References

External links
 Taza SC on Goalzz.com
 Iraq Clubs- Foundation Dates

2015 establishments in Iraq
Association football clubs established in 2015
Football clubs in Kirkuk